Derek Lee Shelton (born July 30, 1970) is an American professional baseball coach and former catcher. He is the current manager of the Pittsburgh Pirates of Major League Baseball (MLB). Shelton has spent the last 15 years as a coach in some capacity at the Major League level.

Shelton was the hitting coach for the Cleveland Indians from 2005 until 2009, and the Tampa Bay Rays from 2010 until 2016. Shelton then worked as the quality control coach for the Toronto Blue Jays in 2017. He was the bench coach for the Minnesota Twins from 2018 through 2019.

College career
Shelton attended Southern Illinois University where he played college baseball for the Salukis. In his sophomore year (1990), the Salukis  won 49 games and the Missouri Valley Conference championship, and played in the NCAA Tournament. Shelton led the Missouri Valley Conference in 1991, his junior year, by throwing out 43% of opposing baserunners attempting to steal.  Shelton graduated from SIU with a degree in criminal justice.

Minor leagues

Playing career
Shelton was a minor league catcher in the New York Yankees organization in 1992 and 1993, playing alongside Derek Jeter and Mariano Rivera. Shelton played 46 games in his minor league career, and finished with a .341 batting average, one home run, and 19 runs batted in.

Managing career
Shelton managed Yankee minor league teams for three seasons, from 2000 through 2002. His teams achieved a .624 winning percentage, and he managed several future MLB players, including Robinson Canó, Dioner Navarro, and Chien-Ming Wang.

Major league coaching career
After spending five seasons as the hitting coach for the Cleveland Indians, he accepted a job with the Tampa Bay Rays at the same position after the 2009 season. The Rays fired him in September 2016. On December 12, 2016, the Toronto Blue Jays hired him as a quality control coach for the 2017 season. On November 6, 2017, the Minnesota Twins hired Shelton as bench coach for the 2018 season.

On November 27, 2019, Shelton was named the manager of the Pittsburgh Pirates. Shelton became the 41st manager in club history.

Managerial record

Personal life

Shelton and his wife, Alison, have three  children: Jackson, Bella, and Gianna. They live in Treasure Island, Florida.

References

External links

1970 births
Living people
American expatriate baseball people in Canada
Baseball catchers
Baseball coaches from Illinois
Baseball players from Illinois
Cleveland Indians coaches
Greensboro Hornets players
Major League Baseball bench coaches
Major League Baseball hitting coaches
Minor league baseball managers
Minnesota Twins coaches
Oneonta Yankees players
People from Carbondale, Illinois
Pittsburgh Pirates managers
Tampa Bay Rays coaches
Toronto Blue Jays coaches
Southern Illinois Salukis baseball players